The Gouët is a French river, located in the department of Côtes-d'Armor, in the region of Brittany, which drains into the English Channel.

Geography 

The river's source is found at the top of Kerchouan, a shale geological feature located in the commune of La Harmoye. Il prend sa source à la cime de Kerchouan, un relief schisteux situé sur la commune de La Harmoye. Much of the water is from rainfall, however, it is also influenced by a dam in La Méaugon, which collects potable water for the nearby city of Saint-Brieuc. This dam siphons off 86% of the surface of the basin.

The Gouët is an extremely polluted river. Its banks are the site of intensive agriculture, and in addition it receives runoff from multiple nearby oil refineries. Finally, the Gouët is polluted by the waste products from nearby food processing factories.

The width varies between 10 and 23 feet (3 and 7m).

Tributaries 

 The Gouédic, which empties into the river at Légué.

Towns 

Quintin, Ploufragan, Saint-Brieuc, Plérin

See also 
Rivers of France

Notes and references 

Rivers of France
Rivers of Brittany
Rivers of Côtes-d'Armor
0Gouet